Romanism is a derogatory term for Roman Catholicism used when anti-Catholicism was more common in the United States.

The term was frequently used in late-nineteenth and early-twentieth century Republican invectives against the Democrats, as part of the slogan  "Rum, Romanism, and Rebellion" (referencing the Democratic party's constituency of Southerners and anti-Temperance, frequently Catholic, working-class immigrants). The term and slogan gained particular prominence in the 1884 presidential campaign and again in 1928, in which the Democratic candidate was the outspokenly anti-Prohibition Catholic Governor of New York Al Smith.

The term was also used by Democratic Unionist Party founder Ian Paisley in anti-Catholic speeches

See also
Know Nothing
Papist
Popish Plot

References

Further reading 
 Is Romanism Christianity? (1917) by T.W. Medhurst (from The Fundamentals)
 Romanism and the Reformation (1881) by Henry Grattan Guinness
 The Bible and Romanism – the window-dressing continues (2000), by Arthur Noble

Anti-Catholic slurs
History of Catholicism in the United Kingdom
History of Catholicism in the United States

fr:Romanisme